Grace Church is a historic Episcopal church located at Scottsville in Monroe County, New York. The church was designed by noted Rochester architect Harvey Ellis (1852-1904) and built in 1885.  It is in the Latin cross form in the Richardsonian Romanesque style.  It has a native fieldstone lower level with an upper section of frame construction with a non-structural wall of stained glass.  It features rounded apsidal and transept ends topped by conical roofs.  Attached is a Sunday school wing constructed in 1956 and a square, shingled bell tower added in 1976.  It is a congregation in the Episcopal Diocese of Rochester.

It was listed on the National Register of Historic Places in 2010.

References

External links
 Grace Church Website

Churches on the National Register of Historic Places in New York (state)
Episcopal church buildings in New York (state)
Churches completed in 1885
19th-century Episcopal church buildings
Romanesque Revival church buildings in New York (state)
Churches in Monroe County, New York
National Register of Historic Places in Monroe County, New York